Nouaceur is a municipality and the administrative capital of Nouaceur Province in the Casablanca-Settat region of Morocco.  At the 2004 census it had a population of 12,696.

References

Populated places in Nouaceur Province
Municipalities of Morocco
Nouaceur